Gomeo Brennan (born 17 January 1939 in Bimini) is a Bahamian professional welter/light middle/middle/super middle/light heavyweight boxer of the 1950s, '60s and '70s who won the Commonwealth middleweight title (twice), and was a challenger for the World Boxing Association (WBA) World light heavyweight title against Vicente Rondón, his professional fighting weight varied from , i.e. welterweight to , i.e. light heavyweight. Brennan fought out of the Fifth Street Gym in Miami Beach, Florida, he was trained by Angelo Dundee, and managed by Chris Dundee, he was inducted into the Florida Boxing Hall of Fame in 2010.

References

External links

Image - Gomeo Brennan

1939 births
Bahamian male boxers
Light-middleweight boxers
Light-heavyweight boxers
Living people
Middleweight boxers
Super-middleweight boxers
Welterweight boxers
People from Bimini